Tettey-Sowah Banfro (born 30 April 1969) is a Slovenian former handball player.

Early life
Banfro was born to a Slovenian mother and a Ghanaian father.

Club career
After playing for Celje, Banfro was transferred to Yugoslav champions Metaloplastika in 1987, aged 18. He spent four seasons in Šabac, helping the team defend the Yugoslav Championship title in his debut season. In 1991, Banfro moved to Croatian club Zagreb, becoming back-to-back European Cup winner in 1992 and 1993.

International career
At international level, Banfro represented Slovenia in two European Championships (1994 and 2000). He also participated in the 2000 Summer Olympics.

Personal life
Banfro is the father of fellow handball player Filip Banfro.

Honours
Metaloplastika
 Yugoslav Handball Championship: 1987–88
Zagreb
 European Cup: 1991–92, 1992–93
Celje
 Slovenian First League: 1999–2000
 Slovenian Cup: 1999–2000

References

External links
 Olympic record
 
 

1969 births
Living people
People from Slovenj Gradec
Slovenian people of Ghanaian descent
Yugoslav people of Ghanaian descent
Slovenian male handball players
Yugoslav male handball players
Olympic handball players of Slovenia
Handball players at the 2000 Summer Olympics
Competitors at the 1993 Mediterranean Games
Mediterranean Games medalists in handball
Mediterranean Games bronze medalists for Slovenia
RK Metaloplastika players
RK Zagreb players
Handball-Bundesliga players
Expatriate handball players
Slovenian expatriate sportspeople in Croatia
Slovenian expatriate sportspeople in Switzerland
Slovenian expatriate sportspeople in Germany